Kelham Island is one of Sheffield's eleven designated Quarters.  Formerly an industrial area, the island itself was created by the building of a goit, or mill race, fed from the River Don to serve the water wheels powering the workshops of the areas' industrial heyday. The quarter was named after the island, however, the boundaries extend beyond the physical island created by the river and goit.

The Quarter is roughly diamond in shape, and is bordered by Shalesmoor and Gibraltar Street to the south-west; Corporation Street to the south-east; Mowbray Street, Harvest Lane and Neepsend Lane to the north-east, and Ball Street and Cornish Street to the north-west.  The Cornish Place Works sit just outside this quarter, to the north-west. Green Lane and Alma Street form the main spine roads of the area. The Green Lane Works (Grade II* listed) and the Brooklyn Works (Grade II listed) are both important industrial heritage sites. A great deal of urban regeneration is evident in this area, as residential and social uses are mixed into this former industrial area.

The area is home to an industrial museum, the Kelham Island Museum, including the famous River Don Engine. The Chimney House for events and occasions and five pubs: the Kelham Island Tavern (twice CAMRA National Pub of the Year), the Fat Cat, The Wellington, the Ship Inn and The Milestone. It is also host to the Kelham Island Brewery (brewers of Pale Rider, amongst others). The area is the only area in Sheffield with its own dedicated app This Is Kelham that supports independent businesses, regeneration and aids the funding of community projects. The Quarter housed one of Sheffield's last traditional hand-made scissor makers, Ernest Wright and Son Limited, until their relocation to premises closer to the city centre in 2011.

Residences 
One of the residences in Kelham Island is Central Quay, a student residence owned by Host. On 11 November 2007, Tesco opened an Express store in the back of the building, facing onto Corporation Street. Kelham Island has started to be redeveloped in recent years (2019). More and more students are starting to live here as more flats are created.

Little Kelham

Citu, a Yorkshire based sustainable property developer acquired an area in Kelham Island in 2012, to create a low carbon development. The development was named Little Kelham, and used triple glazed windows, high standards of insulation and air-tight building design to create zero-emission homes powered entirely by renewable electricity. The scheme has involved the re-generation of some key landmarks in Kelham Island, such as the Green Lane Works clock-tower.  This regeneration was completed in 2017. The development is on-going, and 53 homes have been built to date (Jan 2018).

Kelham Riverside
Kelham Riverside is a mixed use riverside development by Raven Group in collaboration with Sheffield-based architects AXIS Architecture, involves the creation of new mixed use buildings forming apartments, bars & restaurants, and commercial space on the riverside site of former workshops, long since demolished. The development is part of an ongoing regeneration of the area by AXIS and others, which started in the 1990s with Cornish Place. This development is intended to create a desirable place to live with a brand new public square, and continuation of the Don riverside walk project. 

The apartments of the development enjoy riverside views and occupy buildings named Clifton, Millau, and Rialto after the famous bridges. This area and Sheffield as a city has supplied much of the steel for some of the greatest bridges in history (e.g. the Brooklyn Bridge).

Gallery

References

External links
This Is Kelham
The Milestone website
The Fat Cat Public House website
The Chimney House website
Kelham Riverside website
AXIS Architecture
Nprime Limited
 Sources for the history of Kelham Island Produced by Sheffield City Council's Libraries and Archives

Sheffield City Centre (quarters)